The Belize women's national football team is overseen by the Football Federation of Belize. It is affiliated to the Central American Football Union of CONCACAF.

History

Overview
The Belizean team debut on 25 November 2001 in the 2001 Central American Games with Guatemala, which resulted in a crushing 12–0 defeat, two days later played against El Salvador, against which they also lost, 6–0.

Like its male counterpart, is the worst team in Central America according to FIFA ranking, which places the team in the 120th position. All their games have been against Central American teams, but never played with one of them, Honduras.

At the age of 11, Belize international Khalydia Velasquez became the youngest player to score in an official FIFA sanctioned international tournament.

The team had never won or tied and game until the 2022 CONCACAF W Championships where the team tied their first game on April 6, 2022 and won their first game on April 12, 2022.

Results and fixtures

The following is a list of match results in the last 12 months, as well as any future matches that have been scheduled.

Legend

2022

Players

Current squad
The following players were called up for the match against Barbados on 12 April 2022.

Notable players

  Mikhaila Bowden - played for Southern United

Competitive record

FIFA Women's World Cup

*Draws include knockout matches decided on penalty kicks.

Olympic Games

*Draws include knockout matches decided on penalty kicks.

CONCACAF W Championship

*Draws include knockout matches decided on penalty kicks.

Pan American Games

*Draws include knockout matches decided on penalty kicks.

Central American and Caribbean Games

*Draws include knockout matches decided on penalty kicks.

Central American Games

*Draws include knockout matches decided on penalty kicks.

References

External links
Official website
FIFA profile

Central American women's national association football teams
Belize women's national football team
2001 establishments in Belize
Association football clubs established in 2001